Many plants that grow in the American West have use in traditional and herbal medicine.

List of medicinal plants
 Black sage, (Salvia mellifera), can be used against pain.  A strong sun tea of the leaves and stems of the plant can be rubbed on the painful area or used to soak one's feet.  The plant contains diterpenoids, such as aethiopinone and ursolic acid, that are pain relievers.

 Broadleaf plantain (Plantago major) is one of the most abundant and widely distributed medicinal crops in the world. A poultice of the leaves can be applied to wounds, stings, and sores in order to facilitate healing and prevent infection. The active chemical constituents are aucubin (an anti-microbial agent), allantoin (which stimulates cellular growth and tissue regeneration), and mucilage (which reduces pain and discomfort). Plantain has astringent properties, and a tea made from the leaves can be ingested to treat diarrhea and soothe raw internal membranes.
 California bay (Umbellularia californica) leaves were used by the Tongva people to treat pain.

 California poppy (Eschscholzia californica) was chewed by California Indians to treat toothache and to decrease milk production in nursing mothers anti-galactogogue.

 Ephedra spp. is used as a diuretic, as a treatment for urinary tract infections, for asthma, and as stimulant due to the presence of ephedrine and other compounds. The sale of dietary supplements containing ephedra has been banned in the United States due to the risk of serious adverse events or death.
 Horsetail or Scouring Rush (Equisetum spp.) is used as a diuretic because of it contains high concentrations of oxalic acid and calcium oxalate and therefore can also be a throat irritant if brewed improperly.

 Matilija poppy, (Romneya coulteri) is applied topically to treat sunburn.

 Willow Salix spp. used to treat headache and as an antipyretic due to the content of salicylic acid.
 Yarrow (Achillea millefolium) is used for various ailments including cramps, fevers, and toothache.

See also
List of plants used in herbalism
Traditional medicine
Herbalism

References

Further reading 
There are several books about western medicinal plants:

  A comprehensive collection of many plants with descriptions of their uses.
  Very thorough discussion of California medicinal plants.
  A partial list of plants used in the west.
  A field guide with photographs of each plant and descriptions of their uses.
  Gives the Chumash Indian and scientific basis for use of many plants, along with color photographs of each plant. Cecilia Garcia is a Chumash healer.
  A discussion of Cahuilla Indian plants and their uses.  Saubel is a Cahuilla Indian.

External links
 A Guide to Medicinal and Aromatic Plants

Medicinal
Medicinal
•
Indigenous peoples of California topics
Western United States